Bradley Kaipo Sarbida Tavares (born December 21, 1987) is an American professional mixed martial artist. Tavares currently competes in the middleweight division for the Ultimate Fighting Championship (UFC). A professional since 2007, Tavares fought in local promotions before joining the UFC's The Ultimate Fighter 11 in 2010.

High school career
Tavares excelled in high school athletics at Waiakea High School competing in football and in track and field. After high school, he worked as a ramp agent for Hawaiian Airlines. He was 19 when he first fought as a professional.

Mixed martial arts career

Early career

Tavares started his MMA career in 2007 in his home state of Hawaii, compiling a record of 5–0, with three technical knockouts and two submission wins. He originally started training with MMAD (Mixed Martial Arts Development) ran by the likes of Randy Leuder, Brandon Wolff (UFC), and Rob Hesia. He still returns home to Hawaii to train with HQ MMA when not training at Xtreme Couture in Las Vegas.

The Ultimate Fighter 11

In March 2010, Tavares was announced as part of the eleventh season of The Ultimate Fighter. In the elimination round, Tavares defeated Jordan Smith via KO (knee) after less than a minute. He was selected fifth by Team Liddell and tenth overall.

Tavares then defeated James Hammortree in the second preliminary fight. After two rounds, the fight was declared a draw and the fighters went to a third round. Tavares took control in the third round and was declared the winner, advancing him into the quarter finals.

In the quarter-finals, Tavares fought Seth Baczynski. As the first round ended, Baczynski threw an illegal soccer kick to the head of Tavares. Baczynski immediately apologized, knowing he could have seriously hurt Tavares, who went to his corner and slumped. After discussing the matter with the doctors, Herb Dean stopped the fight and Tavares was declared the winner by disqualification, advancing him to the semi-finals.

In the semi-finals, Tavares faced teammate Court McGee, for a place in the live final. After a fairly even first two rounds, Tavares was rocked late in the third. McGee then locked in a rear naked choke, handing Tavares his first loss.

Ultimate Fighting Championship
At The Ultimate Fighter: Team Liddell vs. Team Ortiz Finale, Tavares had a rematch with Seth Baczynski. Tavares defeated Baczynski via unanimous decision.

Tavares next faced UFC veteran Phil Baroni on January 1, 2011, at UFC 125. He won the fight via KO in the first round.

Tavares faced Aaron Simpson on July 2, 2011, at UFC 132, replacing Jason Miller, who was removed from the card. He lost the fight via unanimous decision.

Tavares was expected to face Tim Credeur on October 29, 2011, at UFC 137.  However, Creduer was forced out of the bout, and he was replaced by promotional newcomer Dustin Jacoby.  Unfortunately, Tavares was pulled out of the newly made fight due to an injury, setting up a fight between Jacoby and fellow UFC newcomer Clifford Starks.

Tavares fought Yang Dongi on May 15, 2012, at UFC on Fuel TV: The Korean Zombie vs. Poirier. Tavares won a closely contested fight via unanimous decision (29–28, 29–28, 29–28).

Tavares faced Riki Fukuda on March 3, 2013, at UFC on Fuel TV 8 and won via unanimous decision.

Tavares faced Robert McDaniel on August 28, 2013,  at UFC Fight Night 27. He won the fight via unanimous decision.

Tavares faced Lorenz Larkin on January 15, 2014,  at UFC Fight Night 35. He won the fight via unanimous decision.

Tavares faced Yoel Romero at UFC on Fox 11. He lost the fight via unanimous decision, ending his five-fight win streak.

Tavares next faced Tim Boetsch on August 16, 2014, at UFC Fight Night 47. He lost the fight via TKO in the second round, marking the first time Tavares had been stopped as a professional.

Tavares faced Nate Marquardt on January 3, 2015, at UFC 182. He won the fight by unanimous decision.

Tavares faced Robert Whittaker on May 10, 2015, at UFC Fight Night 65. He lost the fight via knockout in the first round.

Tavares was very briefly linked to a bout with Thales Leites on August 6, 2016, at UFC Fight Night 92. However, Tavares was forced out of the fight with a rib injury, and he was replaced by Chris Camozzi.

Tavares returned to face Caio Magalhães on September 10, 2016, at UFC 203. He was awarded a split decision victory.

Tavares was expected to face Héctor Lombard on January 28, 2017, at UFC on Fox 23. However, the bout was scrapped on January 10 due to undisclosed reasons.

Tavares faced Elias Theodorou on July 7, 2017, at The Ultimate Fighter 25 Finale. He won the fight by unanimous decision.

Tavares faced Thales Leites on October 7, 2017, at UFC 216. He won the fight by unanimous decision.

Tavares faced Krzysztof Jotko on April 14, 2018, at UFC on Fox 29. He won the fight via technical knockout in round three.

Tavares faced Israel Adesanya on July 6, 2018, at The Ultimate Fighter 27 Finale. He lost the fight via unanimous decision.

Tavares was expected to face Ian Heinisch on October 26, 2019, at UFC Fight Night 162 However, Heinisch withdrew from the bout, leading Tavares to replace Krzysztof Jotko against Edmen Shahbazyan at UFC 244 on November 2, 2019. He lost the fight via knockout in the first round.

Tavares was scheduled to face Antônio Carlos Júnior on March 14, 2020, at UFC Fight Night 170.  However, Tavares was forced to pull out of the fight due to an anterior cruciate ligament (ACL) injury. The bout with Antônio Carlos Júnior was rescheduled for on January 24, 2021 at UFC 257.  Tavares won the fight via unanimous decision.

Tavares faced Omari Akhmedov on July 10, 2021, at UFC 264. He won the fight via split decision.

Tavares was scheduled to face Brendan Allen on December 4, 2021, at UFC on ESPN 31.  He eventually pulled out in mid November and was replaced by Roman Dolidze.

Tavares next faced Dricus du Plessis at UFC 276 on July 2, 2022. He lost the fight via unanimous decision.

Tavares was scheduled to face Gregory Rodrigues on January 21, 2023, at UFC 283. However, Tavares withdrawn from the bout due to an injury.

Tavares is scheduled to face Bruno Silva on April 22, 2023, at UFC Fight Night 222.

Championships and accomplishments

Mixed Martial arts
 Ultimate Fighting Championship
 Most decision wins in UFC Middleweight division history (12)
 Most decision bouts in UFC Middleweight division history (16)
 Second most wins in UFC middleweight history (14) (Tied with Anderson Silva and Derek Brunson)
 Most unanimous decision wins in UFC Middleweight division history (9)
 Most split decision wins in UFC Middleweight division history (3) (Tied with Krzysztof Jotko)
 Fourth highest decision wins per win percentage in UFC history (12 decision wins / 14 overall wins: 85.7%)

Mixed martial arts record

|-
|Loss
|align=center|19–7
|Dricus du Plessis
|Decision (unanimous)
|UFC 276
| 
|align=center|3
|align=center|5:00
|Las Vegas, Nevada, United States
|
|-
|Win
|align=center|19–6
|Omari Akhmedov
|Decision (split)
|UFC 264 
|
|align=center|3
|align=center|5:00
|Las Vegas, Nevada, United States
|
|-
|Win
|align=center|18–6
|Antônio Carlos Júnior
|Decision (unanimous)
|UFC 257 
|
|align=center|3
|align=center|5:00
|Abu Dhabi, United Arab Emirates
|
|-
|Loss
|align=center|17–6
|Edmen Shahbazyan
|KO (head kick)
|UFC 244 
|
|align=center|1
|align=center|2:27
|New York City, New York, United States
|
|-
|Loss
|align=center|17–5
|Israel Adesanya
|Decision (unanimous)
|The Ultimate Fighter: Undefeated Finale 
|
|align=center|5
|align=center|5:00
|Las Vegas, Nevada, United States
|
|-
|Win
|align=center|17–4
|Krzysztof Jotko
|TKO (punches)
|UFC on Fox: Poirier vs. Gaethje
|
|align=center|3
|align=center|2:16
|Glendale, Arizona, United States
|
|-
|Win
|align=center|16–4
|Thales Leites
|Decision (unanimous)
|UFC 216 
|
|align=center|3
|align=center|5:00
|Las Vegas, Nevada, United States
|
|-
|Win
|align=center|15–4
|Elias Theodorou
|Decision (unanimous)
|The Ultimate Fighter: Redemption Finale
|
|align=center|3
|align=center|5:00
|Las Vegas, Nevada, United States
|
|-
|Win
|align=center|14–4
|Caio Magalhães
|Decision (split)
|UFC 203
|
|align=center|3
|align=center|5:00
|Cleveland, Ohio, United States
|
|-
|Loss
|align=center| 13–4
|Robert Whittaker
|KO (punches)
|UFC Fight Night: Miocic vs. Hunt
| 
|align=center|1
|align=center|0:44
|Adelaide, Australia
|
|-
|Win
|align=center|13–3
|Nate Marquardt
|Decision (unanimous)
|UFC 182
|
|align=center|3
|align=center|5:00
|Las Vegas, Nevada, United States
|
|-
|Loss
|align=center|12–3
|Tim Boetsch
|TKO (punches) 
|UFC Fight Night: Bader vs. St. Preux
|
|align=center|2
|align=center|3:18
|Bangor, Maine, United States
|
|-
|Loss
|align=center|12–2
|Yoel Romero
|Decision (unanimous)
|UFC on Fox: Werdum vs. Browne
|
|align=center|3
|align=center|5:00
|Orlando, Florida, United States
|
|-
|Win
|align=center|12–1
|Lorenz Larkin
|Decision (unanimous)
|UFC Fight Night: Rockhold vs. Philippou
|
|align=center|3
|align=center|5:00
|Duluth, Georgia, United States
|
|-
|Win
|align=center|11–1
|Robert McDaniel
|Decision (unanimous)
|UFC Fight Night: Condit vs. Kampmann 2
|
|align=center| 3
|align=center| 5:00
|Indianapolis, Indiana, United States
| 
|-
|Win
|align=center|10–1
|Riki Fukuda
|Decision (unanimous)
|UFC on Fuel TV: Silva vs. Stann
|
|align=center| 3
|align=center| 5:00
|Saitama, Japan
| 
|-
|Win
|align=center|9–1
|Tom Watson
|Decision (split)
|UFC on Fuel TV: Struve vs. Miocic
|
|align=center| 3
|align=center| 5:00
|Nottingham, England
| 
|-
|Win
|align=center|8–1
|Yang Dongi
|Decision (unanimous)
|UFC on Fuel TV: The Korean Zombie vs. Poirier
|
|align=center| 3
|align=center| 5:00
|Fairfax, Virginia, United States
| 
|-
|Loss
|align=center|7–1
|Aaron Simpson
|Decision (unanimous)
|UFC 132
|
|align=center| 3
|align=center| 5:00
|Las Vegas, Nevada, United States
| 
|-
|Win
|align=center|7–0
|Phil Baroni
|KO (knees and punches)
|UFC 125
|
|align=center|1
|align=center|4:20
|Las Vegas, Nevada, United States
|
|-
|Win
|align=center|6–0
|Seth Baczynski
|Decision (unanimous)
|The Ultimate Fighter: Team Liddell vs. Team Ortiz Finale
|
|align=center|3
|align=center|5:00
|Las Vegas, Nevada, United States
|
|-
|Win
|align=center|5–0
|Jonathan João
|TKO (punches)
|X-1: Temple of Boom 4
|
|align=center|1
|align=center|N/A
|Honolulu, Hawaii, United States
|
|-
|Win
|align=center|4–0
|Joshua Ferreira
|Submission (rear-naked choke)
|X-1: Temple of Boom 1
|
|align=center|2
|align=center|2:28
|Honolulu, Hawaii, United States
|
|-
|Win
|align=center|3–0
|Devin Kauwe
|TKO (punches)
|Icon Sport: Hard Times
|
|align=center|1
|align=center|1:52
|Honolulu, Hawaii, United States
|
|-
|Win
|align=center|2–0
|John Ferrel
|Submission (rear-naked choke)
|Niko Vitale Promotions
|
|align=center|1
|align=center|0:18
|Honolulu, Hawaii, United States
|
|-
|Win
|align=center|1–0
|Thomas Sedano
|TKO (punches)
|MMAC: Conflict: The Beginning 
|
|align=center|1
|align=center|0:40
|Honolulu, Hawaii, United States
|

See also

 List of current UFC fighters
 List of male mixed martial artists

References

External links
 
 

1987 births
Living people
American male mixed martial artists
Mixed martial artists from Hawaii
Middleweight mixed martial artists
American people of Korean descent
People from Honolulu County, Hawaii
Ultimate Fighting Championship male fighters